The New Zealand Oaks is a Group 1 Thoroughbred horse race for three-year-old fillies run at set weights over a distance of 2400 metres ( miles) on the third Saturday of March every year at Trentham Racecourse in Wellington, New Zealand.

It was run at Riccarton until 1972 and over the distance of  miles to 1974.

It is currently raced on the same day as the:

 Levin Classic (1600m) for 3 year horses.
 Cuddle Stakes (1600m) for fillies and mares.
 New Zealand St. Leger (2600m).
 Lightning Handicap (1200m).

Notable winners

With the consistent strength of New Zealand fillies, the race has an impressive list of winners, including:
 Bonneval: twice New Zealand Horse of the Year, winner of the 2017 Cambridge Stud Sir Tristram Fillies Classic, Lowland Stakes, Australian Oaks (ATC), Feehan Stakes and Underwood Stakes.
 Glamour Bay: winner of the 1981 Auckland Thoroughbred Breeders Stakes and ARC Royal Stakes and runner up in the 1980 New Zealand 1000 Guineas and 1980 Auckland Thoroughbred Breeders Stakes.
 La Mer.
 Legs: the 2006 Kelt Capital Stakes winner.
 Princess Coup: winner of the 2007 and 2008 Kelt Capital Stakes, 2008 Stoneybridge Stakes and 3rd in the Caulfield Cup.
 Savvy Coup: winner of the 2017 Eulogy Stakes, 2018 Lowland Stakes and Spring Classic plus 3rd in the 2018 Karaka Million 3Y0 Classic and Levin Classic.
 Solveig: the winner of the 1986 Avondale Cup and Captain Cook Stakes.
 Tycoon Lil: winner of 1997 New Zealand 1000 Guineas, 1998 Cambridge Stud Sir Tristram Fillies Classic and Canterbury Guineas, runner up in the 1997 New Zealand 2000 Guineas and Rosehill Guineas and 3rd to Might and Power in the 1998 Cox Plate.

Cup winners Empire Rose and Prize Lady were runners up.

Winning jockeys

The most successful jockeys have been:

 Chris Johnson - 5 wins (1990, 1995, 1997, 1998 and 2018)
 Opie Bosson - 5 wins (2000, 2003, 2007, 2010 and 2021)
 Greg Childs - 4 wins (1982, 1983, 1984 and 1987)

Race results

See also

 Recent winners of major NZ races for 3 year olds
 Desert Gold Stakes
 New Zealand Derby
 New Zealand 1000 Guineas
 New Zealand 2000 Guineas
 New Zealand Thoroughbred Breeders Stakes
 New Zealand St. Leger

References

External links
New Zealand Oaks Winners at Trentham

Horse races in New Zealand
Flat horse races for three-year-olds